Meridemis invalidana is a species of moth of the family Tortricidae first described by Francis Walker in 1863. It is found in India, Sri Lanka, Nepal, Vietnam, Malaysia, China, Taiwan and Korea.

The larvae feed on Piper betle.

References

Moths described in 1863
Archipini